Aarne Ilmari Pulkkinen (1 January 1915, Pielavesi - 30 December 1977) was a Finnish smallholder and politician. He was a member of the Parliament of Finland from 1958 to 1970 and again from 1972 until his death in 1977, representing the Finnish People's Democratic League (SKDL). He was also active in the Communist Party of Finland (SKP).

References

1915 births
1977 deaths
People from Pielavesi
People from Kuopio Province (Grand Duchy of Finland)
Communist Party of Finland politicians
Finnish People's Democratic League politicians
Members of the Parliament of Finland (1958–62)
Members of the Parliament of Finland (1962–66)
Members of the Parliament of Finland (1966–70)
Members of the Parliament of Finland (1972–75)
Members of the Parliament of Finland (1975–79)